Aluva Mahadeva Temple  is an ancient Hindu temple dedicated to Shiva, and situated on the bank of the Periyar River at Aluva manappuram in suburban Kochi. The presiding deity of the temple is Lord Shiva, located in main Sanctum Sanctorum, facing east. According to folklore, sage Parashurama has installed the idol. It is the part of the 108 Shiva Temples of Kerala. The temple is located around 4 km away from Pookad Junction on the route of Pokad - Thoraikadavu Road. The temple is mostly known for the Aluva Sivarathri festival.

References 

108 Shiva Temples
Shiva temples in Kerala
Hindu temples in Ernakulam district